The 1920 Milan–San Remo was the 13th edition of the Milan–San Remo cycle race and was held on 25 March 1920. The race started in Milan and finished in San Remo. The race was won by Gaetano Belloni.

General classification

References

1920
1920 in road cycling
1920 in Italian sport
March 1920 sports events